"Here Comes the Hammer" is a song written and performed by MC Hammer, first released on his 1990 album, Please Hammer Don't Hurt 'Em. It was also released as a single, which reached number 54 on the Billboard Hot 100. The song also reached the Top 20 on the Billboard Hot R&B/Hip-Hop Songs and Hot Rap Songs charts. 

"Here Comes the Hammer" was also nominated for a Grammy Award. At the time of its release, the music video accompanying the release of the single was one of the most expensive ever.

Lyrics and music
Hartford Courant critic Dawne Simon described "Here Comes the Hammer" as "upbeat", but the lyrics as "egotistical chants".  Billboard described it as a "James Brown-inspired funk rave, replete with rapid-fire rhyming, a rousing chant at the chorus and infectious synth line". The song samples Brown's 1970 hit "Super Bad".

Reception
Billboard considered "Here Comes the Hammer" to be a "winner". However, although the three previous singles from the album were Top 10 hits, "Here Comes the Hammer" stalled at number 54 on the Billboard Hot 100.  It performed better on the Billboard Hot R&B/Hip-Hop Songs and Hot Rap Songs charts, peaking at number 15 and number 17, respectively. It was nominated for a 1991 Grammy Award for Best Rap Solo Performance at the 34th Annual Grammy Awards.

"Here Comes the Hammer" was later included on Hammer's 1996 compilation album, Greatest Hits. It was also included on the multi-artist compilation album, Original Hits: Rap & Soul, in 2010.

Authorship controversy
Besides utilizing James Brown's "Super Bad," at least two other authors claimed that "Here Comes the Hammer" was based on their work. The band Legend Seven claimed that the refrain chanting "uh oh" was taken from one of their songs. In addition, a musician named Kevin Abdullah sued Hammer, claiming that the hook and refrain were taken from his song "Oh Oh, You Got the Shing", and that "Here Comes the Hammer" "incorporated substantial and significant portions" of "Oh Oh, You Got the Shing". Abdullah claimed that he had once auditioned "Oh Oh, You Got the Shing" for Hammer, and sent Hammer a demo tape containing it, which Hammer rejected. Hammer eventually settled the suit for $250,000.

Track listing
 "Here Comes The Hammer" (12" Remix)
 "Here Comes The Hammer" (12" Remix Instrumental)
 "Here Comes The Hammer (Uh-Oh Here Comes The Hammer '91)"
 "Here Comes The Hammer" (7" Edit)

Music video
The music video accompanying "Here Comes the Hammer" cost more than $1 million, making it one of the most expensive music videos ever made at the time. The MTV version of the video was almost nine minutes long, and a fifteen minute version was also available. The plot of the video involves Hammer and his dancers getting chased through various rooms of a haunted house. New York Daily News critic Michael Saunders criticized the video for emphasizing the lame plot over MC Hammer's dancing. Both Saunders and Entertainment Weekly critic James Farber criticized most of the expensive special effects, but Saunders praised the effects used to create a montage of Hammer dancing with Brown, whose backing band is what Saunders believes is "the engine powering the single".

Charts

Weekly charts

Year-end charts

Certifications

References

1990 singles
1990 songs
Capitol Records singles
MC Hammer songs
Songs written by MC Hammer